KAKE (channel 10) is a television station in Wichita, Kansas, United States, affiliated with ABC and owned by Lockwood Broadcast Group. The station's studios are located on West Street in northwestern Wichita, and its transmitter is located in rural northwestern Sedgwick County (on the town limits of Colwich).

KAKE serves as the flagship of the KAKEland Television Network (KTN), a regional network of eight stations (three full-power, two low-power, two translators and one digital replacement translator) that relay ABC network programming and other programs provided by KAKE across central and western Kansas, as well as bordering counties in Colorado and Oklahoma. The station's distinctive call sign is pronounced as "cake," although it has been branded as "KAKEland"—after the aforementioned statewide relay network—since July 2011.

History
The station first signed on the air on October 19, 1954, as KAKE-TV (the "-TV" suffix was dropped in 2010). The television station was started up by KAKE Broadcasting Company, owner of AM radio station KAKE (AM 1240, now KNSS at AM 1330). It has always been an ABC affiliate.

KAKE-TV and ABC programs were seen in the late 1950s and early 1960s on two additional stations in western Kansas: KTVC (channel 6) at Ensign, which signed on August 1, 1957, and KAYS-TV (channel 7) in Hays, which took to the air in 1958. The stations branded as the "Golden K Network". However, KAKE would lose both stations when they defected to CBS in 1961 and 1962. On October 28, 1964, KAKE signed on KUPK-TV (channel 13) in Garden City to serve as a satellite station for southwestern Kansas.

During the 1970s, KAKE received letters, poems and packages from the "BTK" serial killer. One claimed responsibility for several of the BTK murders; another contained clues about an intended victim (who survived). During an interview with Wichita's police chief in the late 1970s, subliminal messages were broadcast on KAKE to convince the BTK killer to turn himself in; the effort was unsuccessful. In 2004 and 2005, the BTK killer once again sent letters to KAKE – one included a word puzzle, while another expressed concern about the colds that anchors Susan Peters and Jeff Herndon had suffered at the time. Park City resident Dennis Rader was eventually arrested and convicted of the murders.

In 1979, the station was sold to the San Francisco-based Chronicle Publishing Company, run by the de Young family, who also owned KRON-TV in San Francisco and WOWT-TV in Omaha, Nebraska; KRON (as well as a translator of that station), WOWT and KAKE and its translators all have facility IDs in the same range (which were assigned by the Federal Communications Commission around 1980). In 1987, Chronicle purchased KLBY (channel 4) in Colby, an independent station that had ceased broadcasting in December 1985, and converted it into a satellite of KAKE. In 1988, KAKE moved all of its translators on UHF channels 70 to 83 (which were being phased out from broadcasting use) to other, lower channel positions; in addition, a few the affected translators were shut down outright.

On June 16, 1999, the deYoung family announced that it decided to liquidate Chronicle Publishing's assets. KAKE, its satellites, and WOWT were sold to LIN TV (KRON was later sold to Young Broadcasting, which became involved in a contract dispute with NBC, which had bid for the station, that led to KRON losing its NBC affiliation in January 2002). Almost as soon as the sale was finalized, LIN turned around and traded KAKE and WOWT to Benedek Broadcasting in a cash deal, in exchange for NBC affiliate WWLP in Springfield, Massachusetts. The acquisition of KAKE and WOWT could be seen as the ultimate undoing for the financially challenged Benedek, which in 2002 declared for Chapter 7 bankruptcy; the company then sold most of its stations, including KAKE and WOWT, to Atlanta-based Gray Television. Another translator shuffle occurred on August 15, 2003, as three of the station's low-power repeaters changed channel allocations: K20BU (channel 20) in Russell moved to channel 38 as K38GH, K22CP (channel 22, now KHDS-LD) in Salina moved to channel 51 as K51GC, and K69DQ (channel 69, now KGBD-LD) in Great Bend moved to channel 30 as K30GD.

On September 14, 2015, KAKE and its satellites were put up for sale, as Gray entered into a deal to acquire the broadcasting assets of Schurz Communications, including rival KWCH, a station that Gray intends to retain. On October 1, Gray announced that it would sell KAKE to Lockwood Broadcast Group, and in return receive WBXX-TV in Knoxville and $11.2 million. On January 1, 2016, Lockwood (through Knoxville TV LLC) took the operations of the stations via Local Marketing Agreement. The sale was completed on February 1.

Programming
KAKE broadcasts the entire ABC schedule, except for occasional preemptions for breaking news or severe weather coverage. Syndicated programs currently broadcast by KAKE include The Good Dish, Rachael Ray, Modern Family and Entertainment Tonight.

News operation

KAKE presently broadcasts 34 hours of locally produced newscasts each week (with 5½ hours on weekdays, 3½ hours on Saturdays and three hours on Sundays). For 30 years, KAKE was the highest-rated station in the Wichita–Hutchinson market, even though it did not build an extensive translator/satellite network in central and western Kansas until the 1980s. For most of the last quarter-century, it has been the #2 station in the Wichita–Hutchinson Market.

In January 2011, KAKE expanded its weekday morning newscasts to 2½ hours, with the addition of a half-hour at 4:30 a.m., becoming the first station in the Wichita–Hutchinson market to expand its morning newscast to a pre-5:00 a.m. timeslot. On July 17, 2011, beginning with its 5:30 p.m. newscast, KAKE became the second television station in the Wichita–Hutchinson market (after KWCH) to begin broadcasting its local newscasts in high definition (KSNW remained the only station in the market whose newscasts were not produced in HD, broadcasting them in widescreen enhanced definition until January 27, 2014, with weather segments only broadcasting in high definition prior to that). With the change, the station introduced a new graphics package, a custom news music package (composed by Aircast Custom Music), and a new station logo that emphasizes the long used "KAKEland" sub-branding for its network of satellite and repeater stations. When KAKE made the switch to HD, it also began using automated production for its newscasts. Like other Gray stations at the time, it used Ross OverDrive automation (still in use today). KAKE discontinued its half-hour 4:00 p.m. newscast in September 2011, due to a lack of a solid syndicated programming lead-out for the program. A 4:00 p.m. newscast returned to the schedule on September 9, 2013; later that week on September 15, KAKE debuted an hour-long Sunday morning newscast from 8:00 to 9:00 a.m. 
 
In 2018, KAKE ended production of the political talk show This Week in Kansas and the Sunday night legal advice program Lawyer on the Line.

In October 2019, it was announced that KAKE would assume production of the 9:00 p.m. newscast for Fox-affiliated station KSAS-TV beginning on January 1, 2020, with Katie Taube assuming it as anchor; the newscast had been produced by KSNW.

Notable former on-air staff
 Jonathan Coachman – sports anchor/reporter (later with World Wrestling Entertainment, now with ESPN)
 Steve Doocy – host of PM Magazine (now co-host of Fox and Friends on Fox News Channel)
 Tony Laubach – KAKEland Storm Ranger, Meteorologist, from 2018 to 2021
 Susan Peters – anchor, from 1996 to 2016; retired

Technical information

Subchannels
The station's signal is multiplexed:

On September 7, 2012, KAKE began carrying the classic television network MeTV on its second digital subchannel. In addition to the MeTV schedule, KAKE-DT2 airs programming from Weekend Adventure on Sunday mornings, including Outback Adventures with Tim Faulkner and Hearts of Heroes.

On January 28, 2022, KAKE began broadcasting three networks owned by the E. W. Scripps Company: Bounce TV on 10.3, Defy TV on 10.4, and Newsy (now Scripps News) on 10.5.

Analog-to-digital conversion
KAKE shut down its analog signal, over VHF channel 10, on February 17, 2009, the original target date in which full-power television stations in the United States were to transition from analog to digital broadcasts under federal mandate (which was later pushed back to June 12, 2009). The station's digital signal relocated from its pre-transition UHF channel 21 to VHF channel 10.

Satellite stations and translators
To reach viewers throughout the 69 counties comprising the Wichita–Hutchinson Plus market, KAKE extends its over-the-air coverage area through a network of eight full-power, low-power and translator stations encompassing much of the western two-thirds of Kansas, branded as the KAKEland Television Network (originally known as the Kansas Television Network until 2001). Nielsen Media Research treats KAKE and its satellites as one station in local ratings books, using the identifier name KAKE+.

Garden City satellite KUPK maintains a separate studio facility, which houses its Western Kansas newsroom, and produces a local news insert that airs nightly during simulcasts of KAKE's Wichita-based newscasts on KUPK and KLBY.

The KAKEland WeatherPlex, which is based in the main news set at KAKE's West Street studio in Wichita, can provide live continuous severe weather coverage to any combination of its five broadcast zones.
KAKE and its DTV Replacement translator – south-central Kansas, including Wichita and Hutchinson
KUPK – southwest Kansas, including Dodge City and Garden City
KLBY – northwest Kansas, including Goodland and Colby
KHDS – north-central Kansas, including Salina
KGBD-LD and its K25CV-D/K33NP-D translators – North Central Kansas, including Great Bend, Hays, and Russell

As an example, if a tornado is in progress near Colby, live continuous storm coverage will be carried exclusively on KLBY, while regularly scheduled programming is carried on KAKE and each of its other repeaters.

Full-power stations
These stations mostly rebroadcast KAKE. However, their full-power license allows them to broadcast different programming and commercial content, when desired.

Notes:
1. The call sign changed from KUPK-TV to KUPK on July 13, 2010.
2. KUPK-DT operated on channel 18 before February 17, 2009.
3. KLBY was an independent station from July 4, 1984 until December 26, 1985. It then was silent until being acquired by KAKE.
4. KLBY formerly operated on VHF analog channel 4 until August 19, 2008, becoming the first digital-only station in the KAKEland Television Network.

Digital low-power and translator stations
The following stations performed a flash-cut when converting to digital. The translators on channels 70 to 83 moved in 1988, and many moved again on August 15, 2003.

Low-power stations
These stations mostly rebroadcast KAKE. However, their low-power license allows them to broadcast different programming and commercial content, when desired.

Notes:
6. Call sign changed from K51GC to KHDS-LP on July 13, 2010, and to KHDS-LD on December 10, 2012.
7. Originally on channel 34 (K34AA), then 22 (K22CP); moved to channel 51 (K51GC) on August 15, 2003.
8. Call sign changed from K30GD to KGBD-LP on July 13, 2010, and to KGBD-LD on February 7, 2013.
9. Originally on channel 71 (K71BP); moved to channel 69 (K69DQ) in 1988, then to channel 30 (K30GD) on August 15, 2003.

KGBD-LD translator stations
These stations can only rebroadcast KGBD-LD, due to their translator classification.

10. The Hays translator formerly used the callsign K70FE, and originally broadcast on UHF channel 70, from the 1970s to 1988.
11. K33NP-D formerly used the callsign K75CB from the 1970s to 1988, when its calls were changed to K20BU and moved to channel 20; the calls were changed on August 15, 2003 to K38GH until it converted to digital on October 21, 2013 as K38GH-D. Upon moving to channel 33 effective August 30, 2018, the call sign changed to K33NP-D.

"DTV Replacement" digital translator station
The FCC determined that after the digital transition, some full-power television stations would not be able to maintain the same signal coverage areas as their analog signals did, resulting in gaps in coverage. It created the "Replacement Digital Television Translator Service" to assist qualifying full-power stations. These are associated with, given the same call letters, cannot be transferred, and are renewed/assigned along with the station's main license.

On February 9, 2010, KAKE filed an application to the FCC to operate a digital fill-in translator on its pre-transition digital allotment, UHF channel 21, to serve Wichita proper and surrounding areas located north and west of the city. Some viewers using indoor "set-top antennas", which by the nature of their compact design perform better with UHF signals, had difficulty receiving the station's digital signal after it "moved" to VHF channel 10. The translator signed on the air on March 4, 2010.

This station can only rebroadcast KAKE, due to its translator classification.

Channel 70+ translators no longer in service

References

External links

AKE (TV)
Lockwood Broadcast Group
ABC network affiliates
MeTV affiliates
Bounce TV affiliates
Defy TV affiliates
Scripps News affiliates
Television channels and stations established in 1954
1954 establishments in Kansas
Low-power television stations in the United States